Terry Ian Butcher (born 28 December 1958) is an English football manager and former player. He works as an academy coach for Ipswich Town.

During his playing career as a defender, Butcher captained the England national team, winning 77 caps in a ten-year international career that featured three FIFA World Cups. Butcher also enjoyed success in his club career, particularly with Ipswich Town and Rangers. He has subsequently managed clubs in England, Scotland, Australia and Wales and also had a brief spell in charge of the Philippines national team.

Early life
Born in Singapore, where his father was commissioned with the Royal Navy, Butcher spent most of his childhood in Lowestoft, Suffolk, where he attended Lowestoft Grammar School. He turned down the chance to join the Norwich City youth team, as he was a fan of East Anglian rivals Ipswich Town. He joined the Portman Road club in August 1976 after a three-week trial.

Club career

Ipswich Town
Butcher made his debut for Ipswich Town against Everton in the First Division on 15 April 1978 and over the next eight seasons would establish himself as the club's top central defender, combining leadership with great aerial ability and courage. This was soon noticed by England manager Ron Greenwood who gave him his debut in a friendly against Australia in 1980.

In 1981, Butcher was part of the Ipswich side that won the UEFA Cup under Bobby Robson and came close to their first League title since 1962, though they were pipped at the post by Aston Villa.

Butcher was named Player of the Year in 1985 and 1986, the latter season seeing Ipswich relegated to the Second Division.

Rangers
In 1986, Butcher left Ipswich when they were relegated, and became one of the first 'English invasion' players to join Scottish club Rangers following the appointment of Graeme Souness as manager. Souness, the former Liverpool player, paid Ipswich £725,000 for him in July 1986. As captain, he led them to three League titles in four seasons, plus two Scottish League Cups.

In November 1987 he broke his leg during a Scottish Premier Division fixture against Aberdeen, which ruled him out for the rest of the season. In April 1988 Butcher was convicted of disorderly conduct and breach of the peace due to his behaviour in an Old Firm match in November 1987. He was fined £250. In October 1988 Butcher was the subject of a police investigation when he kicked the referee's room door off its hinges after a match at Pittodrie. No criminal charges were brought, but the SFA fined Butcher £1500. Butcher was the subject of a £1million bid from Manchester United in July 1988, but this was rejected by Rangers.

His last Rangers game came in September 1990, in a 2–1 league defeat against Dundee United. He was partly responsible for both of the opposition's goals, leading to him being dropped from the side. In November 1990, he was approached by Leeds United, and came close to signing for the Elland Road club, but was then offered job as player-manager of Coventry City.

Coventry City
Leeds United manager Howard Wilkinson was soon in talks with Graeme Souness about bringing Butcher back south of the border, but when Butcher did depart from Ibrox it was in a £400,000 deal to become player-manager of Coventry City on 15 November 1990. One of his first games as Coventry manager was against the Leeds side he had come close to signing for, holding them to a 1–1 league draw at Highfield Road on 24 November. Other promising early results included a thrilling 5–4 home win over cup holders Nottingham Forest in the Football League Cup fourth round on 28 November. However, their quest for the League Cup ended in the quarter-finals on 23 January 1991 when they were beaten 1–0 at home by eventual winners Sheffield Wednesday. Six days later their FA Cup was ended in a fourth round replay defeat by Southampton

Butcher made six league appearances for the Sky Blues as they finished 16th in the 1990–91 First Division and then retired as a player. In the 1991–92 season, Coventry defeated Luton Town 5–0 in their second league game and achieved a surprise 2–1 away win over defending league champions Arsenal, as well as a 1–0 home win over local rivals Aston Villa- to occupy sixth place in the league by the end of September, putting them ahead of more fancied teams including Liverpool and Everton. However, their form dropped  over the next two months, and by the end of November they had fallen to 13th place. A 2–1 home defeat by Tottenham Hotspur on New Year's Day 1992 saw them enter the new year in 15th place, six points clear of the relegation zone.

Butcher was dismissed on 6 January 1992 after just over a year as Coventry City manager, being replaced by his recently appointed assistant Don Howe.

Later career
Butcher re-registered himself as a player in August 1992, when he signed for Sunderland – founder members of the new Division One, which was the second tier of English football following the creation of the new FA Premier League. He played 38 times for the Wearside club in 1992–93, becoming player-manager following the dismissal of manager Malcolm Crosby in January 1993 and securing their Division One survival by a single place. He never played again for the club and was sacked on 26 November 1993 after a disappointing start to the 1993–94 season saw them battling relegation once again – with the battle being won under Butcher's successor Mick Buxton.

Butcher then played three games for Clydebank before retiring as a player.

International career

Butcher's performances for Ipswich were noticed by England manager Ron Greenwood, who gave him his debut in a friendly against Australia on 31 May 1980, when he was 21 years old. He won his second cap 10 months later in a 2–1 defeat against Spain (also a friendly).

Butcher was the youngest member of the back four that featured at the 1982 World Cup in Spain. He became a regular member of the national side at this stage and remained England's first choice centre-back for the rest of the decade, playing in the 1986 World Cup. In that tournament he played in the quarter final against Argentina in which Diego Maradona passed five English players before scoring, a goal sometimes described as the 'goal of the century'.

A broken leg meant that Butcher was not in the England side that exited at the group stage of the 1988 European Championship while manager Robson was forced to rely on an inexperienced defensive partnership of Tony Adams and Mark Wright.

While playing for England in a vital World Cup qualifier against Sweden in Stockholm on 6 September 1989, Butcher suffered a deep cut to his forehead early in the game. Butcher had some impromptu stitches inserted by the physiotherapist and, swathed in bandages, continued playing. His constant heading of the ball – unavoidable when playing in the centre of defence – disintegrated the bandages and reopened the cut to the extent that his white England shirt was red with blood by the end of the game. The image is regarded as iconic.

England made the semi-finals of the 1990 World Cup with Butcher at the helm of a more-cautious back five (Butcher with Wright and Des Walker in the centre, plus full-backs Stuart Pearce and – initially – Gary Stevens, later Paul Parker); he also took over the captaincy after an injury ended Bryan Robson's tournament prematurely. After the World Cup, Butcher retired from international football with 77 caps and three goals to his name over a period of 10 years.

Managerial career

Coventry City
Butcher left Rangers on 15 November 1990 to become player-manager of Coventry City (as successor to John Sillett). At one month short of 32 he was the youngest manager in the Football League on his appointment.

Under Sillett, Coventry had won the FA Cup in 1987 and finished as high as seventh in the First Division in 1989, but a dismal start to the 1990–91 season had seen Coventry fall back into the relegation battle that had been all too familiar occurrence at Highfield Road since Coventry first reached the top flight in 1967. With Butcher's appointment as manager, Coventry were intent on returning to their winning ways. Butcher steered Coventry to 16th place and safety in 1990–91, and they entered 1992 in 13th place, but he was sacked as manager on 6 January 1992.

Butcher had played six league games for Coventry in the 1990–91 season before announcing his retirement as a player.

Sunderland
In February 1993, Butcher was named manager of Sunderland, re-registering himself as a player two years after his last game. He achieved survival at the end of the 1992–93 season, but was sacked the following December.

Motherwell
In October 2001, Butcher became assistant to Eric Black at Motherwell in the Scottish Premier League, taking over from Black a year later as the club was forced to deal with severe financial difficulties, and Butcher has been praised by the club's supporters and media for his performance under those difficult circumstances. Motherwell reached the 2005 Scottish League Cup Final, where his old team Rangers defeated them 5–1.

Sydney
After being linked for several weeks with a possible move to Sydney FC, Butcher was announced as their new head coach on 17 May 2006, signing a two-year contract. On 7 February 2007, he was sacked after the club were knocked out of the finals series with a 3–2 aggregate loss to the Newcastle Jets.

Brentford
On 30 March 2007, Butcher was appointed as assistant coach at Partick Thistle. However, this was a short lived appointment as he became the manager of Brentford on 24 April 2007 (he officially took up the role on 7 May 2007).

After a poor run of results, including only 5 wins in 23 matches, and under increasing pressure from the fans who had been chanting the name of former boss Martin Allen, he left Brentford on 11 December 2007.

Scotland national team
Butcher was named as George Burley's assistant in 2008 during Scotland's World Cup 2010 qualifying campaign. Butcher still harboured resentment for Maradona's Hand of God goal against England 22 years earlier. So in the days leading up to a friendly against Argentina, managed by Diego Maradona, Butcher's views on Maradona were a talking point in the media. Butcher said in interviews that Maradona was a cheat and a liar, and he would be happy to see him lose. Scotland lost the game 1–0. When Maradona was asked about what Butcher had said about him, he replied "Who is Butcher?"

In November 2009 George Burley was sacked as Scotland manager and at the same time Butcher left by mutual consent.

Inverness

On 27 January 2009, Butcher was appointed manager of Inverness Caledonian Thistle, signing an 18-month contract. Butcher was joined in Inverness by Maurice Malpas as his assistant manager. In May 2009, Inverness were relegated from the Scottish Premier League. 
After a bad start to the 2009–10 First Division league campaign, Butcher managed to turn things around for Inverness. By the end of March, Butcher had guided his club from 16 points behind league leaders Dundee, to four points ahead and top of the Scottish First Division. He was awarded the "Irn Bru Phenomenal" manager of the month award for March. Inverness won the Irn Bru First Division on 21 April after Dundee were beaten 1–0 by Raith Rovers clinching Inverness's return to the Scottish Premier League.

As part of the push for promotion in 2009–10, ICT went on an unbeaten away run in the league that continued through the entire 2010 calendar year, culminating in a 1–1 draw against Hearts at Tynecastle on 18 December. In April 2010 his contract was extended to the end of the 2011–12 season. In the SPL 2010–11 season, the club finished seventh, only narrowly missing out on a top six finish. Butcher was inducted to the Scottish Football Hall of Fame in November 2011.

In the 2012–13 season Butcher received a Manager of a month award for a second time in November, along with two Inverness players Aaron Doran and Billy McKay, having receiving it for October in the 2010–11 season. This was explained due to winning three matches (including away to Celtic) and drawing another, despite the other fixture in the month being a 5–1 defeat to Motherwell and he led the club into second place by the end of 2012. Butcher expressed his delight with the club staying in second place and also his pleasure with the defenders, who were becoming more prominent than his free-scoring forward line.

In January 2013, Butcher rejected an offer to manage Barnsley, having been linked to succeed Keith Hill. After rejecting Barnsley, Butcher explained that one of his reasons for staying was his belief that the club could make history and that he was happy to continue his stay in Scotland. His decision to stay was greeted with relief by defender Daniel Devine, who had signed for the club earlier that month.

Butcher's efforts in guiding Inverness to their top six finish were recognised when he was nominated in the four-man shortlist for PFA Scotland Manager of the Year.

Hibernian
On 5 November 2013, Inverness confirmed that they had received an official approach from fellow Premiership side Hibernian to replace former manager Pat Fenlon with Butcher. On 11 November, Hibernian reached a compensation deal with Inverness for Terry Butcher to move to the club, alongside assistant manager Maurice Malpas. Butcher agreed to a three-year contract, and his appointment was confirmed by the club on 12 November.

A week after Butcher's departure, Inverness supporters responded to his departure with "Terry who?" in the match against St Johnstone. On 2 January 2014, Butcher won the first Edinburgh derby of his managerial career, as they won 2–1. Butcher failed to sign any players in mid-January until signing Daniel Boateng, Danny Haynes and Duncan Watmore on the last day of the transfer window.

As the months progressed, Hibernian's results went badly. His predecessor, Pat Fenlon, had left the team in a mid-table position, but a series of bad performances led to Butcher apologising and supporters describing his tactics as "gutless", "passionless" and "clueless". Hibernian dropped to the bottom half in the league, putting them at risk of relegation. Defeats in the bottom half for Hibernian led Butcher to cancel players' day-off. Further defeats to Ross County and Kilmarnock placed Hibernian eleventh place and facing the play-offs to keep their Premiership place.

On 25 May 2014 Hibernian were relegated to the Scottish Championship, losing a two-leg playoff against Hamilton Academical. After the match, Butcher described Hibernian relegation as his "darkest day in football". Butcher was criticised by James McPake, who Butcher replaced as captain with Liam Craig, for not selecting him to play despite being fit. After a meeting with new chief executive Leeann Dempster to discuss Hibs' future plans, Butcher was sacked by the club on 10 June 2014. There were also rumours of Butcher losing the dressing room and then asking players to leave the club in the January transfer window, only to use them to help the club survive relegation.

Butcher interviewed for the vacant managerial position at Motherwell in December 2014, but then asked not to be considered for the position.

Newport County
On 30 April 2015 Butcher was appointed manager of Welsh club Newport County in League Two on a two-year contract. He took up the role at the end of the 2014–15 season in preparation for the following season, but was sacked on 1 October 2015 with Newport bottom of League Two after gaining just five points from the first ten matches of the season.

Philippines
On 14 June 2018, Butcher was announced as the new head coach of the Philippines. In 2016, he almost got appointed as head coach of Global Cebu which was set to play in the inaugural edition of the Philippines Football League, but the club favoured Japanese coach Toshiaki Imai instead. He was due to lead the Philippines national team in the 2019 AFC Asian Cup, but on 2 August 2018, he announced that he will not take the role as head coach of the national team because he did not believe the system is in place for his time in charge of the Philippines to be successful. His assistant coach, Scott Cooper took over his post and take charge of the team's 2019 Asian Cup preparations.

Guangzhou R&F
On 26 July 2019 it was confirmed, that Butcher had joined the coaching staff of Chinese club Guangzhou R&F to help fix the teams leaky defence. He was hired as a defensive coach.

Return to Ipswich Town
In February 2020 it was announced that Butcher would be taking up a new role with Ipswich Town, primarily working with the club's academy whilst also having some involvement with the first-team, but he left the club again in July 2021.

Media career

While living in Suffolk Butcher had a chain of insurance brokers which were later acquired by the Norwich and Peterborough Building Society. Butcher has appeared as a pundit for England matches on BBC Radio Five Live, Europa League matches on Five and on Setanta Sports' SPL coverage. Butcher also worked for BBC Sport during the 2006 World Cup.

Butcher consistently raised concerns over the sum impact of David Beckham's performances for and involvement with the England national football team, most notably during discussions concerning team and squad selection questions for the 2006 World Cup and Euro 2008 qualification campaign.

Personal life
Butcher was married in 1980 and has a house in Bawdsey. His parents, as well as wife Rita's, still live in Suffolk. Of his three sons, Christopher served in the Royal Artillery in Afghanistan. Christopher died in October 2017, aged 35. Butcher is a cousin of the Scottish retired footballer Pat Nevin.

Butcher is a fan of heavy metal band Iron Maiden and is friends with bassist and founding member Steve Harris. He is a supporter of the Conservative Party.

Career statistics

Club

Managerial

Honours

Player
Ipswich Town
 UEFA Cup: 1980–81

Rangers
 Scottish Football League Premier Division: 1986–87, 1988–89, 1989–90 
 Scottish League Cup: 1986–87, 1988–89

Individual
Ipswich Town Player of the Year: 1984–85, 1985–86
 Rangers Hall of Fame: inducted 2000
Ipswich Town Hall of Fame: Inducted 2010
 Scottish Football Hall of Fame: inducted 2011
English Football Hall of Fame: Inducted 2021

Manager
Inverness Caledonian Thistle
 Scottish First Division (second tier): 2009–10

Individual
Scottish Premiership Manager of the Month: February 2004, September 2004, March 2006, October 2010, November 2012, August 2013

See also
 List of England international footballers born outside England

References

External links
 Terry Butcher's manager profile WTFC.net 
 
 Terry Butcher RSSSF
 Butcher is unable to resist chance to live high life Down Under Times Online 

1958 births
Living people
Singaporean people of English descent
Sportspeople from Suffolk
People from Lowestoft
English footballers
Association football central defenders
Ipswich Town F.C. players
Rangers F.C. players
Coventry City F.C. players
Sunderland A.F.C. players
Clydebank F.C. (1965) players
English Football League players
Scottish Football League players
UEFA Cup winning players
England under-21 international footballers
England B international footballers
England international footballers
1982 FIFA World Cup players
1986 FIFA World Cup players
1990 FIFA World Cup players
English football managers
Coventry City F.C. managers
Sunderland A.F.C. managers
Motherwell F.C. non-playing staff
Motherwell F.C. managers
Sydney FC managers
Brentford F.C. managers
Inverness Caledonian Thistle F.C. managers
Hibernian F.C. managers
Newport County A.F.C. managers
Philippines national football team managers
English Football League managers
Scottish Premier League managers
A-League Men managers
Scottish Professional Football League managers
Scottish Football Hall of Fame inductees
English expatriate football managers
English expatriate sportspeople in the Philippines
English expatriate sportspeople in Australia
Expatriate football managers in the Philippines
Expatriate soccer managers in Australia